Skylar Annette Neese (February 10, 1996July 6, 2012) was an American teenage girl who disappeared from her home in Star City, West Virginia, around midnight on July 6, 2012. Neese's body was found on January 16, 2013, in Wayne Township, Greene County, Pennsylvania.

Neese was murdered by two of her high school best friends, Shelia Eddy and Rachel Shoaf. On January 3, 2013, Shoaf confessed to authorities that she and Eddy planned and carried out Neese's murder. Shoaf pleaded guilty to second-degree murder on May 1, 2013, and was sentenced to 30 years in prison with eligibility for parole after 10 years. Eddy pleaded guilty to first-degree murder on January 24, 2014, and was sentenced to life in prison with eligibility for parole after 15 years. Neese's disappearance led to new West Virginia legislation that made changes to the AMBER Alert missing child alert system.

Disappearance 
On July 5, 2012, Neese returned to her family's Star City, West Virginia apartment after working a shift at Wendy's. Her apartment complex's surveillance video shows Neese left the apartment via her bedroom window at 12:30 a.m. on July 6 and got into a sedan with Rachel Shoaf and Sheila Eddy. Neese's father said she did not take her cell phone charger, her window was left open, and that she planned on coming home.

Investigation 
Neese was initially considered by law enforcement authorities to be a runaway and an Amber Alert was not immediately issued in connection with her disappearance.  An early tip indicated that Neese had been seen in North Carolina, but the Star City Police Department determined that the person spotted was not Neese. Neese's parents posted flyers about their missing daughter in the Monongalia County region. Police determined that the unknown sedan in which Neese was last seen belonged to Eddy and interviewed her. Eddy admitted to picking up Neese but stated that she had dropped her off an hour later. The FBI and the West Virginia State Police joined the search for Neese on September 10, 2012, and began interviewing Neese's school friends.

The break in the case came when Shoaf admitted plotting with Eddy to kill Neese. The motivation Shoaf gave for the murder was they "didn't like her" and "didn't want to be friends with her anymore". David Neese stated that these two girls were among his daughter's best friends and that Eddy had even helped the family by distributing missing person flyers. After her confession, Shoaf led investigators to Neese's body. On March 13, 2013, U.S. Attorney William J. Ihlenfeld, II issued a press release stating that a body found in Wayne Township, Greene County, Pennsylvania on January 16, 2013 had been identified as the body of Neese.

Criminal charges 
On May 1, 2013, Shoaf pleaded guilty to second-degree murder. According to the court transcript, Shoaf said that she and Eddy picked up Neese in Eddy's car. The girls drove to Pennsylvania, got out of the car and began socializing. At a pre-arranged time, Shoaf and Eddy stabbed Skylar to death. The teens attempted to bury Neese's body, but were unable to do so and instead covered the body with branches. The court transcript indicates that other students overheard conversations between Shoaf and Eddy about the murder plot, but failed to report it, mistakenly believing that the girls were joking.  According to Shoaf's plea agreement, she pleaded guilty to murder in the second degree by "unlawfully, feloniously, willfully, maliciously and intentionally causing the death of Skylar Neese by stabbing her and causing fatal injuries". In the plea agreement, the State of West Virginia recommended a sentence of 20 years incarceration. Rachel Shoaf expressed remorse and apologized to the Neeses, her own family, and God during her sentencing.  Shoaf's family also issued a public apology for her actions through their lawyer.

On September 4, 2013, West Virginia prosecutors publicly identified Eddy as the second alleged perpetrator of the murder of Neese and announced that she would be tried as an adult. Eddy was indicted by a grand jury on September 6, 2013 on one count of kidnapping, one count of first-degree murder and one count of conspiracy to commit murder. She pleaded not guilty.

The date of the trial was originally set for January 28, 2014. Facing the prospect of additional charges from Pennsylvania authorities, Eddy pleaded guilty to first-degree murder. She expressed no remorse, but was sentenced to life in prison "with mercy"; under West Virginia law, she is eligible for parole after 15 years. Pennsylvania authorities did not file charges as per the plea deal.

Following her guilty plea on May 1, 2013, on February 25, 2014 Shoaf received a sentence of 30 years in prison and will be eligible for parole after 10 years.

Eddy originally was held in a facility for juveniles after her arrest. Both women, now in their  20s, are currently incarcerated at the Lakin Correctional Center in Mason County.

Skylar's Law 
An Amber Alert was not issued in Neese's disappearance because the circumstances did not meet all four criteria for an alert to be issued: (1) a child is believed to be abducted; (2) the child is under 18; (3) the child may be in danger of death or serious injury; (4) there is sufficient information to indicate the Amber Alert would be helpful. A waiting period of 48 hours had to elapse before a teenager could be considered missing. A West Virginia state legislator from the Neese family home district introduced a bill called Skylar's Law to modify West Virginia's Amber Alert plan to issue immediate public announcements when any child is reported missing and in danger, regardless of whether the child is believed to have been kidnapped. Opinion columns appeared in both West Virginia and national media in support of Skylar's Law, some of which also acknowledged criticism and drawbacks of the legislation. On March 27, 2013, the West Virginia House of Delegates approved Skylar's Law with a 98-0 vote.  On April 12, 2013, the West Virginia Senate unanimously passed the law, but made minor technical changes to the bill which the House of Delegates voted to accept on the same day. West Virginia Governor Earl Ray Tomblin signed the legislation into law in May 2013.

See also 
Missing person
Child murder
National Center for Missing & Exploited Children
List of murdered American children
List of solved missing person cases
Murder of Michele Avila
Murder of Shanda Sharer
Murder of Reena Virk
Slender Man stabbing

References

Further reading

2020 ABC January 3, 2015 10:00pm-11:01pm EST - WPVI
2020 ABC July 18, 2014 10:00pm-11:01pm PDT - KGO-TV

External links 
 
  45 minute interview of Skylar Neese's parents.

2012 in Pennsylvania
2012 in West Virginia
2012 murders in the United States
2013 in West Virginia
Deaths by person in Pennsylvania
Deaths by stabbing in Pennsylvania
Formerly missing people
July 2012 crimes in the United States
Missing person cases in West Virginia
Murder committed by minors
West Virginia law
Criminal duos